Omar Kholeif is an Egyptian-born artist, curator, writer and editor. Kholeif's curatorial practice focuses on art that intersects with the internet, as well as works of art from emerging geographic territories that have yet to be seen in the mainstream.

Kholeif is currently the Sharjah Art Foundation’s Director of Collections and Senior Curator. Previous roles have included Senior Visiting Curator at HOME Manchester; Co-Curator of the 14th Sharjah Biennial; Curator of the V-A-C Foundation Venice headquarters, Palazzo delle Zattere, during the 58th Venice Biennale; a curator for Abu Dhabi Art, and is a guest curator and advisor for numerous international festivals and biennials.

Previously, Kholeif was the Manilow Senior Curator and Director of Global Initiatives at the Museum of Contemporary Art Chicago. Prior to that, they were Curator at the Whitechapel Gallery, Senior Editor at Ibraaz Publishing and Senior Curator at Cornerhouse in Manchester. Previously, they were Curator at the Whitechapel Gallery, Senior Editor at Ibraaz Publishing and Senior Visiting Curator at HOME in Manchester.

Early life and education
Kholeif was born in Cairo, Egypt and holds degrees from the University of Glasgow, the Royal College of Art, London, and the University of Reading, where they completed a PhD in curatorial and cross-disciplinary cultural studies.

Career 
Previously, Kholeif was Curator at the Whitechapel Gallery, Senior Visiting Curator at Cornerhouse and HOME in Manchester, Curator at Foundation for Art and Creative Technology (FACT), London and Senior Editor at Ibraaz Publishing. Their work focuses on issues of narrative and geography in contemporary accelerated culture. They have curated major exhibitions nationally and internationally including the Cyprus Pavilion at the 56th Venice Biennale, Abraaj Group Art Prize at Art Dubai and Armory Focus: Middle East, North Africa and the Mediterranean at the Armory Show, New York.

Kholeif is the author and/or editor of over two-dozen books and has written for The Guardian, Frieze, Wired and HuffPost. Their books include: Vision, Memory and Media (2010), Jeddah Childhood circa 1994 (2014) and You Are Here: Art After the Internet (2014) which was reviewed in Artforum by Douglas Coupland as the "smartest book on this topic."

In 2014, Kholeif was voted one of the 50 most powerful people in the Middle Eastern art world by Canvas Magazine, one of the 100 most powerful people in the art world by ArtLyst and one of eight curators to watch by Artsy.

Kholeif has taught and guest lectured at numerous universities including the University of Chicago, Hunter College, New York, Northwestern University, and the Ruskin School of Art, University of Oxford. They are a Fellow of the Royal Society of Arts, a Churchill Fellow, a member of ICOM, the International Council of Museums, CIMAM, International Committee for Museums and Collections of Modern Art, and AICA, the International Association of Art Critics.

Selected exhibitions 
Sharjah Art Foundation

 Sharjah Biennial 14: Leaving the Echo Chamber (with publication) (2019)
 Art in the Age of Anxiety (group show) (with publication) (June–September 2020)
 Unsettled Objects (group show) (with publication) (March 2021) 
 Hrair Sarkissian: The Other Side of Silence (with publication) (2021)

1-54 Contemporary African Art Fair

 Continental Drift, London (2021)

The Modern Art Museum of Fort Worth

 Hrair Sarkissian (2020)

Manchester International Festival

 David Lynch: My Head is Disconnected (2019)

V-A-C Foundation

 Time, Forward! Pavilion at the 58th Venice Biennale (with publication) (2019)

Museum of Contemporary Art Chicago

 Basim Magdy: The Stars Were Aligned for a Century of New Beginnings (December 2016) (with publication)
 Eternal Youth (group show) (March 2017)
 Michael Rakowitz: Backstroke of the West (September 2017) (with publication) 
 We Are Here (MCA 50th anniversary exhibition) (October 2017) 
 Chicago Works: Paul Heyer (Spring 2018) (with publication) 
 Otobong Nkanga: To Dig a Hole That Collapses Again (March 2018) (with publication)
 I Was Raised on the Internet (Summer 2018)

Ministry of Education and Culture (Cyprus)

 Cyprus Pavilion at the 56th Venice Biennale: Two Days After Forever, Venice and Alexandria (with publication) (2015)

The Armory Show

 Focus: Middle East, North Africa and the Mediterranean (with publication) (2015)

Art Dubai

 Yto Barrada: Faux Depart (with publication) (2015)
 Before History: Abraaj Group Art Prize (with publication) (2015)

Whitechapel Gallery

 Mike Nelson: Once Again (More Things) (a table ruin) (with publication) (2014)
 Fiona Banner: Stamp Out Photographie (2015)
 Lynette Yiadom-Boakye: Natures Natural and Unnatural (with publication) (2015)
 James Richards: To Replace a Minute's Silence with a Minute's Applause (in partnership with the V-A-C Foundation) (2015)
 Emily Jacir: Europa; Imperfect Chronology: Debating Modernism and Mapping the Contemporary (Works from the Barjeel Art Foundation) (2016-2017)
 Imperfect Chronology: Debating Modernism I and II (with publication) (2016)
 Electronic Superhighway: From Experiments in Art and Technology to Art After the Internet (2016)
 Imperfect Chronology Mapping the Contemporary I and II (with publication) (2016/17)
 Artists' Film International (2014-ongoing)

HOME

 The Heart is Deceitful Above All Things (with publication) (2015)
 Imitation of Life: Melodrama and Race in the 21st Century (with publication) (2016) 
 Joana Hadjithomas and Khalil Joreige: I must first apologise...(tour to Villa Arson, Nice and MIT List Visual Art Center, Cambridge, MA) (with publication) (2016)

ICA London

 Whose Gaze Is It Anyway? (2014)

SPACE

 We Are Here (with publication) (2013)

Liverpool Biennial

 The Unexpected Guest (2012):
 Akram Zaatari
 Anja Kirschner and David Panos
 Pedro Reyes
 Jemima Wyman
 Five Videos: Jemima Wyman, Judith Barry, Kristin Lucas, Lucky PDF, Jennifer Chan, Anahita Razmi. Ming Wong, Queer Technologies, Angelo Plessas, Ofri Cnaani, and Adham Faramawy, curated with Joanne McNeill. 
 Unexpected Conversations and Acts of Wildness

Cornerhouse

 Protect Me From What I Want (2010)
 Subversion (with publication) (2012)
 Mark Amerika: The Museum of Glitch Aesthetics (2012) in collaboration with Lionel Dobie. 
 Jeremy Bailey: Invigilator System (2012)
 What have I done to (de)serve this? in collaboration with BLANKSPACE (2012)
 Clifford Owens (2014)
 Sophia Al-Maria: Virgin With a Memory (with publication) (2014)

FACT, Foundation for Art and Creative Technology

 MyWar (2009)
 I-Dent: Identity and Media Contortion (2010)
 Nam June Paik (2010)
 Ahmed Basiony (2011)
 ZEE (2011)
 Worlds in the Making (2011)
 Topographies of Time (2012)
 Mark Boulos: Echo (2013)
 Science Fiction: New Death with China Miévelle (2014)

References

External links

Sharjah Art Foundation Bio
Sharjah Art Foundation Explores Art in a Digital Age of Anxiety in Vogue Arabia
Interview in Bomb Magazine

Living people
Art curators
Year of birth missing (living people)